Good News Bible (GNB), also called the Good News Translation (GNT) in the United States, is an English translation of the Bible by the American Bible Society. It was first published as the New Testament under the name Good News for Modern Man in 1966. It was anglicised into British English by the British and Foreign Bible Society with the use of metric measurements for the Commonwealth market. It was formerly known as Today's English Version (TEV), but in 2001 was renamed the Good News Translation in the U.S., because the American Bible Society wished to improve the GNB's image as a translation where it had a public perception as a paraphrase. Despite the official terminology, it is still often referred to as the Good News Bible in the United States. It is a multi-denominational translation, with editions used by many Christian denominations. It is published by HarperCollins, a subsidiary of News Corp.

Beginnings
The beginnings of the Good News Bible can be traced to requests made by  people in Africa and the Far East for a version of the Bible that was easier to read. In 1961, a home missions board also made a request for the same type of translation. Besides these requests, the GNB was born out of the translation theories of linguist Eugene Nida, the Executive Secretary of the American Bible Society's Translations Department. In the 1960s, Nida envisioned a new style of translation called Dynamic equivalence. That is, the meaning of the Hebrew and Greek would be expressed in a translation "thought for thought" rather than "word for word". The dynamic theory was inspired by a Spanish translation for Latin American native peoples. 

The American Bible Society, impressed with Nida's theories, decided to use them. Due to these requests and Nida's theories, Robert Bratcher (who was at that time a staffer at the American Bible Society) did a sample translation of the Gospel of Mark. This later led to a translation of the full New Testament. The result, titled Good News for Modern Man: The New Testament in Today's English Version, was released in 1966 as a 599-page paperback with a publication date of January 1, 1966. It received a mass marketing effort with copies even being made available through grocery store chains. The New Testament would see second, third, and fourth editions released in 1967, 1971, and 1976, respectively.

The Psalms were published in 1970 as The Psalms For Modern Man in Today's English Version. Other portions of the Old Testament began to appear over the course of the 1970s - Job in 1971, Proverbs and Ecclesiastes in 1972, Jonah in 1973, Ruth, Hosea, Amos, and Micah in 1974, and Exodus in 1975.

In 1976, the Old Testament was completed and published as the Good News Bible: The Bible in Today's English Version. In 1979, the Apocryphal/Deuterocanonical Books were added to the Good News Bible and published as Good News Bible: Today's English Version with Deuterocanonicals/Apocrypha and also later published as part of subsequent Catholic and Orthodox Editions. In 1992, the translation was revised with inclusive language.

The Bible Societies released the Contemporary English Version in 1995, also using jargon-free English. While this translation is sometimes perceived as a replacement for the GNB, it was not intended as such, and both translations continue to be used. While the American Bible Society promotes both translations, the British and Foreign Bible Society and HarperCollins have since 2007 refocused their publishing efforts on the GNB including the Good News Bible iPhone App.

Popularity
The GNB has been a popular translation used across multiple denominations of Christianity. By 1969, Good News for Modern  Man had sold 17.5 million copies. By 1971, that number had swelled to 30 million copies. It has been endorsed by Billy Graham and several Christian denominations, including the Catholic Church in the United States (Today's English Version, Second Edition), the Southern Baptist Convention, and the Presbyterian Church (USA). Excerpts from the New Testament were used extensively in evangelistic campaigns, such as the Billy Graham crusades and others, from the late 1960s right through to the early 1980s. In 1991, a Gallup poll of British parishioners showed that the GNB was the most popular Bible version in that nation. In 2003, the GNB was used as the basis for a film version of the Gospel of John. In 2008, Swedish group Illuminated World paired the text of the GNB with contemporary photography for the English translation of Bible Illuminated: The Book.

Features
The GNB is written in a simple, everyday language, with the intention that everyone can appreciate it, and so is often considered particularly suitable for children and for those learning English. There are introductions to each book of the Bible. Unlike most other translations, some editions of the GNB contain line drawings of biblical events with a snippet of text. The line drawings were done by Annie Vallotton (1915–2013). However, Vallotton is credited with doing the drawings only in certain editions of the GNB—in others, the drawings are simply credited to "a Swiss artist".

Since the focus is strongly on ease of understanding, poetry is sometimes sacrificed for clarity.  This choice can be seen in the example quotation of John 3:16, which is rendered, "For God loved the world so much that …", which is more conversational than the familiar "For God so loved the world". The phrase contains a figurative, if not literal, translation: the Greek word for "so" in that passage is οὕτως, which likely means "in such a way" as well as "so much". Because the implication of the phrase "in such a way that he would sacrifice his only son" includes the implication of "so much" and could certainly not include the opposite "loved the world so little," the translators chose the phrase "so much" for its brevity and clarity.

See also
 American Bible Society
 The Gospel of John - a movie based word-for-word on the Good News Bible.
 Bible translations into English
 List of English Bible translations
 New Living Translation
 Good News Study Bible

References

Citations

Bibliography
 Metzger, Bruce. The Bible in Translation, pp. 167–168.
 Sheeley, Steven M. and Nash, Jr., Robert N. Choosing A Bible,  pp. 38, 52-53.

External links
 Good News Bible (goodnewsbible.com)
 Official website (GNT.Bible) - for the Good News Translation
 Good News Bible text
 Good News Bible  Bible Society page describing 2004 editions
 The best-selling artist of all time? BBC News article highlighting the illustrations of Annie Vallotton in the Good News Bible

1976 books
Bible translations into English
1976 in Christianity